The Principality of Bidache was from 1570 to 1793 a small feudal state in the south west of modern-day France. The sovereignty of Bidache was proclaimed by Count Antoine de Gramont in 1570. The counts of Gramont had formerly been vassals of the King of Navarre however they had last paid tribute in 1434 and considered themselves relieved of their fealty. The principality maintained de jure sovereignty until 1790 when by royal edict the territory of the principality was declared to be a part of France by Louis XVI. In 1793 the principality was occupied by troops loyal to the First French Republic and the last reigning prince, Antoine VII, was ousted. The royal and noble Gramont dynasty survives to the present day.

History

The exact date for the establishment of sovereignty in Bidache is 21 October 1570. On that day, Antoine I de Gramont in his capacity as mayor of Bayonne stated that the sovereignty of Bidache was held by him. This was the first public statement by the Counts of Gramont claiming sovereignty over Bidache. However, a bequest written in private between Antoine and his wife in 1566 refers to his "sovereignty" over Bidache. By the end of 1570, several acts claiming sovereign rights in Bidache appear in quick succession. On 13 November of that same year, Antoine I enforces his rights over the inhabitants of Bidache as their sovereign lord. This is followed in on 6 April 1575 when Antoine formulated a formal legal code.

His successor, Antoine II, uses the title of majesty "for such is our pleasure" in an order issued on 22 September 1596. From this date, he calls his actions "sovereign". External recognition is found in letters patent issued by Henri IV of France and Navarre which refer to Antoine II de Gramont as "ruler of the land of Bidache" and exempt from his edict.

In 1631 Cardinal Richelieu is recorded as having complained that Bidache was a "haven of thieves" and "Judaized" and recommends sending a commissioner to the principality. Nevertheless, the complaint is not acted upon. The evidence that Bidache had become an asylum benefiting those who wanted to escape the kingdoms of France and Navarre indicates the practical implications of Bidache sovereignty.

The de jure end of sovereignty came during the upheaval of the French Revolution. In January 1790 attempts were made to secure the continued existence of the principality separate from the French crown but these came to no avail. An envoy, Louis Perret, was despatched to Paris but he did not arrive before letters patent had been issued in the name of King Louis XVI that decreed Bidache to be a part of the new Basses-Pyrénées département. In 1793 troops loyal to the new French Republic occupied Bidache and ousted the last prince, Antoine VII. With de facto independence at an end the château was briefly converted into a hospital before being burned down in 1796. The ruins are currently being restored.
Around Bidache, the end of Basque home rule in France was happening.

References

See also 
 Bidache
 Gramont
 Kingdom of Navarre

1570 establishments in France
1790 disestablishments in France
Bidache
Bidache
Ancien Régime
Basque history